Matthew Lewis Engel (born 11 June 1951) is a British writer, journalist and editor.

Early life and education
Engel was born in Northampton, son of solicitor Max David Engel (1912-2005) and Betty Ruth (née Lesser). His grandfather had escaped anti-Semitic persecution in Poland.

He was educated at Great Houghton Prep School, Carmel College, Oxfordshire, and Manchester University

Career
He began his career in 1972 as a staff journalist on The Guardian newspaper for nearly 25 years, reporting on a wide range of political and sporting events including a period as Washington correspondent beginning on 9/11. He later wrote columns in the Financial Times and now contributes to both these papers. Engel edited the 1993–2000 and 2004–2007 editions of Wisden Cricketers' Almanack, with a short break when he worked in the US. He has been a strong critic of the International Cricket Council, international cricket's ruling body.

Engel was the Visiting Professor of Media at the University of Oxford for 2011.

Personal life
Engel lives on an old farm in Herefordshire. In 1990, he married former editorial director at Pan Books Hilary, daughter of Laurence Davies. They had a son, Laurie, and adopted a daughter, Victoria (Vika), from Russia. Laurie died of cancer in 2005, aged 13, and Engel set up a successful charity fund in his memory, the Laurie Engel Fund, which has raised more than £1.2m in partnership with the Teenage Cancer Trust to build a new unit for patients in Birmingham (opened 2010) and for a cancer centre scheduled for 2018. The proceeds of a book he wrote, Extracts from the Red Notebooks (Macmillan), are donated to this fund. His book, That’s The Way It Crumbles: The American Conquest of the English Language (Profile Books)  was published in June 2017.

Works
The Reign - Life in Elizabeth's Britain: Part I: The Way It Was, 1952-79 (Atlantic Books, 2022) 
That’s The Way It Crumbles: The American Conquest of the English Language (Profile Books, 2017) 
Engel's England: thirty-nine counties, one capital and one man (Profile Books, 2014) 
Eleven Minutes Late: A Train Journey to the Soul of Britain (Macmillan, May 2009) 
Extracts from the Red Notebooks (Macmillan, 2007)  and his Financial Times column about it
The Bedside Years: The Best Writing from the Guardian 1951–2000 (Atlantic, 2001) ASIN B000Y11LQW
Tickle The Public: One Hundred Years of the Popular Press (Orion, 1996) , paperback (Phoenix, 1997) 
Thirty Obituaries from Wisden (editor) (Penguin Books Ltd, 1996) 
The History of Northamptonshire CCC (County Cricket History) (with Andrew Radd) (Christopher Helm Publishers Ltd, 1993) 
Sports writer's eye: an anthology (Queen Anne Press, 1989) 
The Guardian Book of Cricket (Pavilion Books, 1986)  (Penguin Books, 1987) 
Ashes '85 Pelham Books, 1985) 
Wisden Cricketers' Almanack (editor) (John Wisden & Co Ltd)
2007 , paperback , large print 
2006 , paperback 
2005 , paperback 
2004 , paperback , audio 
2000/The Millennium Edition , paperback 
1999 , paperback 
1998 , paperback 
1997 , paperback 
1996 , paperback 
1995 , paperback 
1994 , paperback 
1993 , paperback 
The Sportspages Almanac: Complete Sporting Factbook (with Ian Morrison) (Simon & Schuster Ltd)
1992 
1991 
1990

References

External links

Column archive at The Financial Times
Column archive at The Guardian
Author profile at PanMacmillan

The Laurie Engel Fund official website

1951 births
Living people
British sportswriters
Cricket historians and writers
Editors of Wisden Cricketers' Almanack
English male journalists
The Guardian journalists
British people of German-Jewish descent
British people of Polish-Jewish descent